Bonito is a comune in the Province of Avellino, in the Region of Campania, Italy. Located in the southern Apennines upon a rounded knoll, it overlooks the Ufita Valley within the historical district of Irpinia.

The town is part of the Roman Catholic Diocese of Ariano Irpino-Lacedonia and its territory borders with the municipalities of Apice, Grottaminarda, Melito Irpino, and Mirabella Eclano.

Famous residents
Salvatore Ferragamo, Italian Fashion shoe designer was born in Bonito.

References

Cities and towns in Campania